Wat Svay Pope is a Theravada Buddhist temple located in Phnom Penh, Cambodia and built in 1929.

History 
Wat Svay Pope was built in 1929.

In June 2002, 100 poor people from Kampong Speu province who had found refuge in the pagoda were chased away and found refuge in the nearby headquarters of political opponent Sam Rainsy, in a political stunt.

On November 28, 2016, the same political opponent Sam Rainsy did not return to Cambodia from exile to attend the cremation of his mother-in-law at Wat Svay Pope after his letter asking Prime Minister Hun Sen for permission to return went unanswered.

In 2021, the Cambodian Ministry of Culture and Fine Arts said it approved the demolition of the 92-year-old temple located at Svay Pope pagoda in Phnom Penh at the request of the pagoda's chief monk after inspections revealed that it was heavily damaged and structurally unsound. The demolition went through despite concerns of some architects who said the “rare Buddhist structure” should have been preserved. Immediately after the outburst of criticism on March 7, the Ministry of Culture and Fine Arts issued a statement.

Architecture 
The architecture of Wat Svay Pope is rare in terms of post-Angkorian Buddhist structures.

Inside the compound, there is a row of golden bell-shaped stupas in front of the pagoda.

To the north, next to the pagoda, there is a modern dark red four-story building.

There are some other old buildings such as the library and the monks' dormitory.

Preah Sihamoni Raja Buddhist College 
In 2005, Preah Sihamoni Raja Buddhist College was founded by Samedech Bour Kry, the Supreme Patriarch of Thommayut Buddhist Order, to provide higher Buddhist studies to the monks. This Buddhist College consists of two departments: the Department of Buddhism and the Department of Administration. It admits 100 monk students.

Location 
Wat Svay Pope is located along Sothearos Street in front of the Embassy of the Russian Federation in Phnom Penh. It is about 100 m from the Aeon Mall of Phnom Penh.

References

20th-century Buddhist temples
Buddhist temples in Cambodia
Religious buildings and structures completed in 1929